Polypoetes jipiro is a moth of the family Notodontidae. It is endemic to cloud
forests along the eastern slope of the Ecuadorian Andes, at altitudes between 2,000 and 3,000 meters.

References

Moths described in 1893
Notodontidae of South America